Asiedu Attobrah is a Ghanaian professional footballer who currently plays for Al-Shorta in the Iraqi Premier League.

Career
Asiedu Attobrah has played for several Ghanaian teams as well as Kortrijk in the Belgian Pro League as a midfielder. He is quick, crafty and agile. Asiedu plays in a more advanced role at times blurring the boundaries between midfielders and forwards. He has good mobility and is skilled at both defending and attacking.

International career
In November 2013, coach Maxwell Konadu invited him to be a part of the Ghana senior squad for the 2013 WAFU Nations Cup He helped the team to a first-place finish after Ghana beat Senegal by three goals to one. As February 1, 2015, he has been invited to join the Ghanaian U-20 team for the African Youth Championship.

References

Living people
Ghanaian footballers
WAFU Nations Cup players
1995 births
Al-Shorta SC players
Association football midfielders
Ghana under-20 international footballers
Ghana A' international footballers
2014 African Nations Championship players
Ghanaian expatriate sportspeople in Belgium
Ghanaian expatriate sportspeople in Iraq
Ghanaian expatriate footballers
Expatriate footballers in Belgium
Expatriate footballers in Iraq